Los Angeles State Historic Park (LASHP) is a California State Park within the Chinatown neighborhood of Los Angeles. Also known as the Cornfield, the former brownfield consists of a long open space between Spring Street and the tracks of the Metro Gold Line. Located outside the main commercial and residential area in the northeast portion of Chinatown, the area is adjacent and southeast of the Elysian Park neighborhood.

History
This former site of the Southern Pacific Transportation Company's River Station (1876−1901) is considered the "Ellis Island of Los Angeles" where new arrivals from the East first disembarked.  Corn leaking from train cars and sprouting along the tracks gave rise to the nickname The Cornfield. The  site was established as a California state park in 2001.

Park development
In 2005, the former industrial site was transformed into a productive cornfield for one season as an art project called "Not a Cornfield."

In 2006, a contest was held in conjunction with the California State Parks Foundation to select a design for the park. The preliminary park opened on September 23 of the same year. Hargreaves and Associates of San Francisco won the competition.

Development of the park has been slow. California's budget deficit forced officials to scale back plans for the park in 2010, earmarking $18 million instead of the planned $55 million. Plans for a bridge, water fountain, theme gardens, an upscale restaurant, as well as an ecology center with restored wetlands were tabled. The tabled features may be added later if funding becomes available. The park open with a campfire circle, restrooms and parking lot.

Numerous community fairs and gatherings have been held in the park. It also contains several plaques that relate the history of the Cornfield, Chinatown and Downtown Los Angeles.

See also
List of California state parks

References

External links 
Los Angeles State Historic Park
Los Angeles State Historic Park official blog

California State Historic Parks
Parks in Los Angeles
Downtown Los Angeles
History of Los Angeles
Protected areas established in 2001
2001 establishments in California
Chinatown, Los Angeles